Samuel Waite Johnson (14 October 1831 – 14 January 1912) was an English railway engineer, and was Chief Mechanical Engineer (CME) of the Midland Railway from 1873 to 1903.  He was born in Bramley, Yorkshire and educated at Leeds Grammar School.

Career
Johnson learned to become an engineer at the locomotive builders E.B.Wilson and Company.

In 1859 Johnson became Acting Locomotive Superintendent at the Manchester, Sheffield and Lincolnshire Railway.  In 1864 he was appointed Locomotive Superintendent of the Edinburgh and Glasgow Railway.  In 1866, after only two years in Scotland he replaced Robert Sinclair of the Great Eastern Railway (GER) at Stratford Works.  There he stayed for seven years until moving to the Midland Railway (MR) at Derby, where he stayed until his retirement in 1904. At the time of appointment to the Midland Railway on 1 July 1873, he was paid a salary of £2,000 per year, rising to £3,500 in 1896 where it remained until his retirement on 31 December 1903.

Locomotive designs

Great Eastern Railway
See: Locomotives of the Great Eastern Railway

Midland Railway
See: Locomotives of the Midland Railway
 115 Class 4-2-2 ("Spinners")
 Class 4 Compound 4-4-0
 179 Class
 483 Class
 1116A Class 0-4-0ST
 1377 Class 0-6-0T
 1738 Class
 2228 Class 0-4-4T
 2441 Class 0-6-0T
 Class 2 & 3 Goods engines 0-6-0
 2501 Class – 30 2-6-0 locomotives built at the Baldwin Locomotive Works, USA
 2511 Class – 10 2-6-0 locomotives built at the Schenectady Locomotive Works, USA

Family

In 1857, Johnson married Emily Priestman in Chipping Ongar, Essex. By 1871 they had had four daughters and one son and were living in Hackney. By 1891 they were living in Nottingham. Emily died prior to 1911. 

S. W. Johnson's father, James Johnson, worked for the Great Northern Railway (GNR) for sixteen years before becoming engineer of the North Staffordshire Railway (NSR). S. W. Johnson's son, also James Johnson, was locomotive superintendent of the Great North of Scotland Railway (GNSR) from 1890 to 1894.

References

English mechanical engineers
English railway mechanical engineers
Locomotive builders and designers
Great Eastern Railway people
Midland Railway people
People educated at Leeds Grammar School
1831 births
1912 deaths